Mher Mkrtchyan may refer to:

 Frunzik Mkrtchyan (Mher Mkrtchyan, 1930–1993), Soviet Armenian actor
 Mher Mkrtchyan (cyclist) (born 1993), Armenian track cyclist